Daniel Benlulu (born 6 May 1958) is a former Israeli politician who served a member of the Knesset for Likud between 2003 and 2006.

Biography
Born in Morocco to Moroccan-Jewish parents, Benlulu made aliyah to Israel in 1969.

In late 2002 he won 20th place on the Likud list for the January 2003 elections (a spot reserved for candidates from the coastal plain), and entered the Knesset when the party won 38 seats. During his first term as an MK, he chaired the House Committee and the Joint Committee for the Knesset Budget.

For the 2006 elections he was placed 16th on the Likud list, but lost his seat when the party won only 12 mandates.

References

External links
 

1958 births
20th-century Moroccan Jews
People from Ashdod
Living people
Likud politicians
Members of the 16th Knesset (2003–2006)